In mathematics, a polynomial matrix or matrix of polynomials is a matrix whose elements are univariate or multivariate polynomials. Equivalently, a polynomial matrix is a polynomial whose coefficients are matrices.

A univariate polynomial matrix P of degree p is defined as:

An example 3×3 polynomial matrix, degree 2:

We can express this by saying that for a ring R, the rings  and
 are isomorphic.

Properties
A polynomial matrix over a field with determinant equal to a non-zero element of that field is called unimodular, and has an inverse that is also a polynomial matrix. Note that the only scalar unimodular polynomials are polynomials of degree 0 – nonzero constants, because an inverse of an arbitrary polynomial of higher degree is a rational function.
The roots of a polynomial matrix over the complex numbers are the points in the complex plane where the matrix loses rank.
The determinant of a matrix polynomial with Hermitian positive-definite (semidefinite) coefficients is a polynomial with positive (nonnegative) coefficients.

Note that polynomial matrices are not to be confused with monomial matrices, which are simply matrices with exactly one non-zero entry in each row and column.

If by λ we denote any element of the field over which we constructed the matrix, by I the identity matrix, and we let A be a polynomial matrix, then the matrix λI − A is the characteristic matrix of the matrix A. Its determinant, |λI − A| is the characteristic polynomial of the matrix A.

References 

 E.V.Krishnamurthy, Error-free Polynomial Matrix computations, Springer Verlag, New York, 1985

Matrices
Polynomials